Gunnin' for That #1 Spot is a 2008 documentary film directed by Adam Yauch, founding member of the Beastie Boys. The movie premiered at the Tribeca/ESPN Sports Film Festival in April 2008 and opened in theaters June 27, 2008.

Synopsis
The film follows 8 of the top high school basketball players in the US at the time of filming, in 2006. The plot centers around the first annual Boost Mobile Elite 24 Hoops Classic at the legendary Rucker Park in Harlem.

By 2009, six of the eight players had joined NBA teams. None of them got the number 1 spot.

By 2011, all eight players were on NBA teams, with Kyle Singler being the last one drafted and the only one to win an NCAA Championship, which he won while playing for Duke University in 2010.

By January 2022, only two of the eight players, Lance Stephenson and Kevin Love, were playing professional basketball in the NBA.

Cast
 Jerryd Bayless - Drafted 11th overall by the Portland Trail Blazers in the 2008 NBA Draft. 
 Michael Beasley - Drafted 2nd overall by the Miami Heat in the 2008 NBA Draft.
 Tyreke Evans - Drafted 4th overall by the Sacramento Kings in the 2009 NBA Draft.
 Donté Greene - Drafted 28th overall by the Memphis Grizzlies in the 2008 NBA Draft.
 Brandon Jennings - Drafted 10th overall by the Milwaukee Bucks in the 2009 NBA Draft.
 Kevin Love - Drafted 5th overall by the Memphis Grizzlies in the 2008 NBA Draft.
 Kyle Singler - Drafted 33rd overall by the Detroit Pistons in the 2011 NBA Draft. 
 Lance Stephenson - Drafted 40th overall by the Indiana Pacers in the 2010 NBA Draft.

Soundtrack
"Lucifer" by Jay-Z
"My First Song" by Jay-Z
"Dirt Off Your Shoulders" by Jay-Z
"Politickin'" by Beastie Boys
"Freaky Hijiki" by Beastie Boys
"Brothers on the Slide" by Cymande
"Running Away" by Roy Ayers
"Hollywood Swinging" by Kool and the Gang
"Cissy Strut" by The Meters
"Number One Spot" by Ludacris
"Looking for the Perfect Beat" by Afrika Bambaataa
"Halftime" by Nas
"Funky Soul" by David Batiste
"Amazon" by M.I.A.
"Pull up the People" by M.I.A.
"Boon Dox" by EPMD
"My Lifestyle" by Fat Joe
"Beasley is a Beastie" by Beastie Boys
"LTD" by Beastie Boys
"The Panda Rat" by Beastie Boys
"Hate it or Love it" by The Game
"Jump Around" by House of Pain
"Straight Outta Compton" (extended mix) by N.W.A
"By the Time I get to Arizona" by Public Enemy
"Rock the Mic" by Beanie Sigel & Freeway
"Root Down & Get it" by Jimmy Smith
"Let's do it Again" by The Staple Singers
"Pump it Up" by Joe Budden
"Friday the 13th" from the Friday the 13th series

References

External links
Gunnin' For That #1 Spot official site

2008 films
American sports documentary films
Beastie Boys
Documentary films about basketball
2008 documentary films
2000s English-language films
2000s American films